Emile Rajah (born 3 October 1987) is a Trinidadian cricketer. He played in one first-class match for Trinidad and Tobago in 2012.

See also
 List of Trinidadian representative cricketers

References

External links
 

1987 births
Living people
Trinidad and Tobago cricketers